Zano Stanley Wast (August 20, 1916 – May 21, 1988) was an American professional basketball player. He played for the Toledo Jim White Chevrolets in the National Basketball League for one total game and did not register a statistic. Wast also played for a number of Amateur Athletic Union and independent league teams.

References

1916 births
1988 deaths
Amateur Athletic Union men's basketball players
American men's basketball players
Basketball players from Akron, Ohio
Forwards (basketball)
Sportspeople from Toledo, Ohio
Toledo Jim White Chevrolets players
Toledo Rockets men's basketball players